Ernest Gagnon (7 November 1834 – 15 September 1915) was a Canadian folklorist, composer, and organist. He is best known for compiling a large amount of French Canadian folk music which he published as Chansons populaires du Canada in 1865–1867. He was greatly admired for his virtuoso performances on the organ and was also considered an expert at plainsong accompaniment.

Biography 
Born in Louiseville, Gagnon was from a prominent family of musicians in Québec City. He is the brother of composer Gustave Gagnon and the uncle of composer Henri Gagnon. His sister Élisabeth was married to pianist Paul Letondal. He studied the organ with Charles Wugk Sabatier. From 1853 to 1864 he was the organist of Saint-Jean-Baptiste Church, and held a similar position at the Notre-Dame Basilica-Cathedral from 1864 to 1876. In 1857 he travelled to Paris after obtaining a study leave and became a pupil of Henri Herz and Alexandre Goria.

Many of his arts songs, choral pieces, and works for solo piano have been published by the Canadian Musical Heritage Society and by Adélard Joseph Boucher. His piano work Stadaconé (1858) was notably the first notated composition to be based on the music of the aboriginal peoples in Canada. He died in Quebec City at the age of 80 and is buried at the Cimetière Notre-Dame-de-Belmont.

References

External links
 
 

1834 births
1915 deaths
19th-century Canadian composers
20th-century Canadian composers
Canadian male composers
Canadian folklorists
Canadian organists
Male organists
People from Rivière-du-Loup
20th-century Canadian male musicians
19th-century male musicians
Academic staff of Université Laval
Université Laval alumni